

The Latécoère 25 was a French airliner built in 1925 for use on Latécoère's own airline and its subsidiaries. Essentially a refined version of the Latécoère 17 with an enlarged wingspan, it supplanted that type in production and then in service.

Operational history 
As Lignes Aériennes Latécoère increasingly shifted its emphasis from carrying passengers to carrying airmail, the Latécoère 25 found its definitive role as a mail plane, and was widely used in establishing the line's South American services. Airlines which operated the type included Aeroposta Argentina. Like the Latécoère 17, it was a conventional parasol-wing monoplane with enclosed seating for passengers and an open cockpit for the pilot.

One Latécoère 25 was involved in a celebrated incident when it made a forced landing high in the Andes. Hitherto, flights between Buenos Aires and Santiago made a  detour to avoid the mountains. With his mechanic Alexandre Collenot and passenger, Count Henry de La Vaulx, Mermoz spent the next four days repairing and lightening the aircraft and making a clear path from it to the edge of the precipice. He then rolled it off the edge, diving to attain airspeed, and successfully reached Santiago.

Survivors 

The only surviving example of a Latécoère 25 is preserved in the Museo Nacional de Aeronáutica de Argentina in Morón. It wears the markings of Aeroposta Argentina.

Variants
Latécoère 25
Latécoère 25-2R production aircraft

Specifications (Laté 25)

References

Further reading

External links
 aviafrance.com
 Уголок неба

1920s French airliners
2
Single-engined tractor aircraft
High-wing aircraft